The Kentucky Downs Ladies Turf Stakes is a Grade III American Thoroughbred horse race for fillies and mares that are three years old or older, over a distance of 1 mile on the turf held annually in September at Kentucky Downs racetrack in Franklin, Kentucky during their short turf meeting.  The event currently carries an offered purse of $750,000.

History 
The race was inaugurated in 1992 as the Rachel Jackson Stakes in honor of Rachel Jackson the wife of Andrew Jackson, the 7th President of the United States. Her family moved close to the area where the Kentucky Downs racetrack is located on the border of Kentucky and Tennessee.

The event was not run for 2 years and when it resumed in 1998 it was run as the Kentucky Cup Ladies Turf Handicap. The event was renamed to its current name Ladies Turf Stakes in 2011.

In 2017 the event was upgraded to a Grade III.

With the influx of gaming revenue at Kentucky Downs the purse for the event has risen dramatically to nearly $500,000 offered by 2019.

Records
Speed record: 
 1 mile: 1:33.53  – Dalika (GER)  (2022)

Margins: 
  lengths – Secret Someone (2016)
 
Most wins by a jockey  
 2 – Rafael Bejarano (2003, 2005)
 2 – Pat Day (1999, 2001)
 2 – Mark Guidry (2004, 2011)
 2 – Larry Melancon (1998, 2000)
 2 – Jose L. Ortiz  (2019, 2020)
 2 – Florent Geroux  (2014, 2021)

Most wins by a trainer
 4 – W. Elliott Walden (1998, 1999, 2000, 2001)

Winners

See also
 List of American and Canadian Graded races

References 

Kentucky Downs
Graded stakes races in the United States
Grade 3 stakes races in the United States
Recurring sporting events established in 1998
1998 establishments in Kentucky
Horse races in Kentucky
Turf races in the United States